Ancestors in the Attic is a Canadian television program about genealogy presented by Reader's Digest Canada and shown on History Television in Canada. It was hosted by Jeff Douglas with professional genealogist Paul J. McGrath until his death on 23 October 2008 while filming in Edinburgh, Scotland. The program is produced by Primitive Entertainment and debuted October 18, 2006.

See also
 African American Lives
 Finding Your Roots
 Who Do You Think You Are?

References

External links
Ancestors in the Attic - Ontario Roots Genealogy Resources

2006 Canadian television series debuts
2008 Canadian television series endings
2000s Canadian documentary television series
History (Canadian TV network) original programming
English-language television shows
Television series about family history